The Capt. Charles C. Henderson House is a historic house at Henderson and 10th Streets in Arkadelphia, Arkansas.  Built in 1906 and significantly altered in 1918–20, it is the largest and most elaborate house of that period on 10th Street.  When first built, it was a -story hip-roofed Queen Anne style house with some Classical Revival elements.  Its most prominent feature from this period is the turret with elaborate finial.  In 1918-20 Henderson significantly modified the house, added the boxy two-story Craftsman-style porch.  The house is now on the campus of Henderson State University.

The house was listed on the National Register of Historic Places in 1998.

See also
National Register of Historic Places listings in Clark County, Arkansas

References

Houses on the National Register of Historic Places in Arkansas
Queen Anne architecture in Arkansas
Neoclassical architecture in Arkansas
Houses completed in 1906
Houses in Arkadelphia, Arkansas
National Register of Historic Places in Clark County, Arkansas
1906 establishments in Arkansas